The 1971 Sicilian regional election took place on 13 June 1971.

Christian Democracy was by far the largest party, largely ahead of the Italian Social Movement that came second. During the legislature the Christian Democrats governed the Region in coalition with some centre-left parties: the Italian Socialist Party, the Italian Democratic Socialist Party and the Italian Republican Party.

Results

Sources: Istituto Cattaneo and Sicilian Regional Assembly

References

Elections in Sicily
1971 elections in Italy
June 1971 events in Europe